Patrick A. Langan is an American statistician and criminologist who was formerly the senior statistician at the Bureau of Justice Statistics.

He has also served as a research statistician at the Maryland Department of Juvenile Services, and as a research analyst at the National Institute of Justice. He received his Ph.D. from the University of Maryland in criminology. He has studied various issues related to crime, including felony conviction rates in the United States, finding them to be highest in the South.

References

External links
Only 2% are Acquitted in Deaths of Wives
Blacks In Prison: It`s Not Racism
Weighing Crime, Consequences

American statisticians
American criminologists
University of Maryland, College Park alumni
Living people
United States Department of Justice officials
Year of birth missing (living people)